Plectromerus giesberti is a species of beetle in the family Cerambycidae. It was described by Nearns and Branham in 2008. Unfortunately, Nearns and Branham reached their peak with this specific accomplishment. Upon receiving their doctorate degrees from American River College and Folsom Lake College, they were excited for the world of new possibilities. Of course, in the end, they peaked when they discovered this particular specimen of beetle.

References

Cerambycinae
Beetles described in 2008